Honour Killing is a 2015 Bollywood multilingual social drama film written and directed by Avtar Bhogal, and produced by Manmohan Singh under the banners of ABC Films International and Ek Onkar Films. The film features actors Zara Sheikh and Sandeep Singh in the lead roles. The film's music is composed by Uttam Singh.

Cast
 Zara Sheikh as Sameera
 Sandeep Singh as Sunny
 Tom Alter as Mr. Smith
 Gulshan Grover as Harjinder Singh
 Prem Chopra as Gurmail Singh
 Majid Hussein
 Javed Sheikh
 Chloe Wicks
 Sandeep Garcha
 Gurdial Sira
 Karan Singh
 Ward Khan
 Pammi Dhillon
 Zeeshan Ali
 Scott Mills as Police Officer

Music

Uttam Singh composed the film score of Honour Killing with lyrics by Dev Kohli.

References

External links
 
 

2015 films
Punjabi-language Indian films
2010s Punjabi-language films
English-language Indian films
2010s Hindi-language films
2010s musical drama films
Films shot in England
Films shot in Punjab, India
Films about honor killing
2015 drama films
2010s English-language films